The Maramag River is located in the province of Bukidnon in the Northern Mindanao region of the Mindanao island group, in the southern Philippines.

Course
The river flows through the town of Maramag. The Maramag River is a tributary of Pulangi Lake and the Pulangi River.

See also

References

Rivers of the Philippines
Landforms of Bukidnon